Dennis "Danger" Madalone (born September 29, 1954) is an American stunt coordinator and musician.

Career
Madalone coordinated stunts for over 400 episodes of Star Trek: The Next Generation, Star Trek: Deep Space Nine and Star Trek: Voyager. He also coordinated stunts for Castle.

In 2002, he released his song and music video, a tribute to the victims of the September 11, 2001, terrorist attacks, titled "America We Stand As One". Described as "the scariest music video", "saccharine" and "bizarre", the video has become an internet phenomenon.

Personal life 
Madalone grew up in South Plainfield, New Jersey and graduated from South Plainfield High School in 1974.

References

External links
 
 

1954 births
Living people
American male film actors
American male television actors
American people of Italian descent
American stunt performers
Male actors from New Jersey
People from South Plainfield, New Jersey